Ngoma Airport  is a rural airstrip serving Ngoma (west of Namwala and south of Itezhi-Tezhi), a settlement in the Southern Province in Zambia.

It has an additional  of gravelled overrun on the east end.

See also

Transport in Zambia
List of airports in Zambia

References

External links
OpenStreetMap - Ngoma Airstrip
OurAirports - Ngoma Airport
FallingRain - Ngoma

Airports in Zambia
Buildings and structures in Southern Province, Zambia